Governor Graham may refer to:

Bob Graham (born 1936), 38th Governor of Florida
Horace F. Graham (1862–1941), 56th Governor of Vermont
Lancelot Graham (1880–1958), Governor of Sind from 1936 to 1941
Stephen Victor Graham (1874–1955), 18th Governor of American Samoa
William Alexander Graham (1804–1875), 30th Governor of North Carolina